The HIW Wildside Provincial Championship was a professional wrestling heavyweight championship in the professional wrestling promotion, High Impact Wrestling Canada.  The title was established on April 24, 2004, as the HIW Great Plains Provincial Championship.  Michael Allen Richard Clark won the Great Plains Provincial Championship on September 20, 2013, then won the Wildside Provincial Championship on November 22, 2013, in a fatal four-way match to crown the first champion.  Upon Clark winning the Wildside Provincial Championship, the Great Plains Provincial Championship was unified with it 24-hours later upon regulation changes.  The lineage from the Great Plains Provincial Championship continued to be recognized with both Clark having separate reigns as champion.  On October 25, 2019, at Monster Brawl VI, Rex Roberts defeated Bobby Sharp to become the final champion in HIW history.  Monster Brawl VI was the HIW's last show as the company ceased operations.  Canadian Wrestling's Elite acquired all of HIW's assets.

Title history

Names

Reigns

|}

Combined reigns

References

High Impact Wrestling Canada championships
State professional wrestling championships